A City Upside Down is a 1933 German comedy film directed by Gustaf Gründgens and starring S.Z. Sakall, Jenny Jugo and Hermann Thimig. It is based on the 1836 play The Government Inspector by Nikolai Gogol. A separate Czech adaptation of the story The Inspector General was made the same year.

The film's sets were designed by the art directors Rochus Gliese and Gabriel Pellon. Paul Martin worked as assistant director on the film. Some location shooting took place in Staufen im Breisgau. This movie is set on the modern day (the 1930s).

Cast

References

Bibliography

External links 
 

1933 films
1933 comedy films
German comedy films
Films of the Weimar Republic
1930s German-language films
Films directed by Gustaf Gründgens
Films based on The Government Inspector
German films based on plays
German black-and-white films
1930s German films